An Unwilling Hero is a 1921 American silent comedy film directed by Clarence G. Badger and written by Arthur F. Statter. The film stars Will Rogers, Molly Malone, John Bowers, Darrell Foss, and Jack Curtis. The film was released on May 8, 1921, by Goldwyn Pictures.

Cast       
Will Rogers as Dick
Molly Malone as Nadine
John Bowers as Hunter
Darrell Foss as Richmond
Jack Curtis as Boston Harry
George Kunkel as Hobo
Richard Johnson as Hobo 
Larry Fisher as Hobo
Leo Willis as Hobo
Nick Cogley as Servant
Edward Kimball as Lovejoy

References

External links

1921 films
1920s English-language films
Silent American comedy films
1921 comedy films
Goldwyn Pictures films
Films directed by Clarence G. Badger
American silent feature films
American black-and-white films
1920s American films